The 2000 ECAC Hockey Men's Ice Hockey Tournament was the 39th tournament in league history. It was played between March 10 and March 18, 2000. Quarterfinal games were played at home team campus sites, while the final five games were played at the Olympic Arena (subsequently renamed Herb Brooks Arena) in Lake Placid, New York. By winning the tournament, St. Lawrence received the ECAC's automatic bid to the 2000 NCAA Division I Men's Ice Hockey Tournament.

Format
The tournament featured three rounds of play. The two teams that finish below tenth place in the standings are not eligible for tournament play. In the first round, the first and tenth seeds, the second and ninth seeds, the third seed and eighth seeds, the fourth seed and seventh seeds and the fifth seed and sixth seeds played a best-of-three series with the three highest-seeded winners advancing to the semifinals and the remaining two winners playing in the Four vs. Five matchup. After the opening round every series becomes a single-elimination game. In the semifinals, the highest seed plays the winner of the four vs. five game while the two remaining teams play with the winners advancing to the championship game and the losers advancing to the third place game. The tournament champion receives an automatic bid to the 2000 NCAA Men's Division I Ice Hockey Tournament.

Conference standings
Note: GP = Games played; W = Wins; L = Losses; T = Ties; PTS = Points; GF = Goals For; GA = Goals Against

Bracket
Teams are reseeded after the First Round

Note: * denotes overtime period(s)

First round

(1) St. Lawrence vs. (10) Union

(2) Colgate vs. (9) Yale

(3) Rensselaer vs. (8) Dartmouth

(4) Cornell vs. (7) Harvard

(5) Clarkson vs. (6) Princeton

Four vs. Five

(4) Cornell vs. (5) Clarkson

Semifinals

(1) St. Lawrence vs. (4) Cornell

(2) Colgate vs. (3) Rensselaer

Third place

(2) Colgate vs. (4) Cornell

Championship

(1) St. Lawrence vs. (3) Rensselaer

Tournament awards

All-Tournament Team
F Keith Dupee (Rensselaer)
F Brandon Dietrich (St. Lawrence)
F Jason Windle (St. Lawrence)
D Justin Harney (St. Lawrence)
D Brian Pothier (Rensselaer)
G Derek Gustafson* (St. Lawrence)
* Most Outstanding Player(s)

References

External links
ECAC Hockey

ECAC Hockey Men's Ice Hockey Tournament
ECAC tournament